Edgeworth is a small village and civil parish in the English county of Gloucestershire. It is located east of Stroud, west of Cirencester and south of Cheltenham.

The Church of St Mary was built in 11th century. It is a grade I listed building.

Governance
Edgeworth is part of the Ermin ward of the district of Cotswold, represented by Councillor Nicholas Parsons, a member of the Conservative Party. Edgeworth is part of the constituency of The Cotswolds, represented at parliament by Conservative Member of Parliament (MP) Geoffrey Clifton-Brown. Prior to Brexit in 2020, it was part of the South West England constituency of the European Parliament.

References

External links

Villages in Gloucestershire
Cotswold District